The San Luis Obispo County Arts Council is the official San Luis Obispo County, California, USA arts council.
It runs under the California state arts council, the California Arts Council (CAC).

External links
Arts Obispo - the San Luis Obispo County Arts Council website

Arts councils of California
San Luis Obispo County, California